Jean-Louis Clerc (3 November 1908 – 28 March 1961) was a Swiss painter. His work was part of the painting event in the art competition at the 1936 Summer Olympics.

References

1908 births
1961 deaths
20th-century Swiss painters
Swiss male painters
Olympic competitors in art competitions
People from Neuchâtel
20th-century Swiss male artists